Rilić is a mountain in Dalmatia, Croatia, located southeast of Biokovo. Its highest peaks are Velika Kapela or Sutvid, Šapašnik and Sveti Ilija.

References

Mountains of Croatia
Landforms of Split-Dalmatia County
Landforms of Dubrovnik-Neretva County